Jastrow may refer to:

 Jastrowie, a town in Poland

As a surname it may refer to:
 Elisabeth Jastrow (1890–1981), German-born classical archaeologist
 Ignaz Jastrow (1856–1937), German economist and historian
 Joseph Jastrow (1863–1944), Polish-American psychologist
 Julie Jastrow, American terrestrial ecologist
 Marcus Jastrow (1829–1903), Jewish scholar
 Morris Jastrow, Jr. (1861–1921), Polish-American Orientalist, son of Marcus Jastrow
 Robert Jastrow (1925–2008), American astronomer
  (born 1942), German Arabist and Syriacist

As a book it may refer to:
  The famous work of Marcus Jastrow, A Dictionary of the Targumim, Talmud Babli, Talmud Yerushalmi and Midrashic Literature

See also 
 Jastrow illusion

Slavic-language surnames
Jewish surnames